Melbourne, the second-largest city in Australia, is home to approximately 758 completed high-rise buildings. Of those completed and or topped-out, 74 buildings are defined as "skyscrapers"–buildings which reach a height of at least ; more than any other city in Australia. Overall, Melbourne's skyline ranks the tallest in the Oceania region and the 24th tallest in the world by the number of completed skyscrapers. Melbourne comprises five of the ten tallest buildings in Australia and the city has routinely hosted the tallest building in Australia to architectural feature or roof. , the tallest building in Melbourne is the 100-storey Australia 108, which stands  in height and whilst the second–tallest building in Australia, it is the tallest to roof.

Geographically, most of Melbourne's tallest skyscrapers are concentrated in the City Centre precinct; however, other locations of prominent skyscrapers and tall buildings in Melbourne include Carlton, Docklands, Southbank, South Melbourne, South Yarra and St Kilda Road. The Melbourne central business district, defined by a grid of streets known as the Hoddle Grid, has a historically low central shopping area with high rise cluster in the western financial district, and another cluster in eastern end. Buildings are more densely packed in the west than the east, although the east has two of the city's tallest buildings to architectural feature—120 Collins Street and 101 Collins Street, respectively, whilst the Rialto Towers (located on the west side) is tallest by roof. In the 2010s, another skyscraper cluster rose in the northern section, with Aurora Melbourne Central the tallest.

Historically, Melbourne has represented several "firsts" and been the holder of various records, both in Australia and internationally. The city is notable for being one of the first cities in the world to build numerous tall office buildings, alongside New York City and Chicago in the United States, though Melbourne's first skyscraper boom was very short lived, 1888–1892. Melbourne was the location for Australia's first high–rise, the APA Building, constructed during this boom in 1889. Melbourne was also the location for the first modern post World War II high-rise in Australia, ICI House built in 1958. From 1986 to 2005, Melbourne's held the title of tallest building in Australia, with the Rialto Towers (1986–1991), 101 Collins Street (1991), and 120 Collins Street (1991–2005). Since 2006, the city has been home to the second-tallest building in the country, the Eureka Tower (2006–2020) and Australia 108 (2020–present); surpassed only by the Gold Coast's Q1, both the Eureka Tower, and later Australia 108, have maintained the title of tallest building in Australia to roof.

History and specifications

19th century
The late 1880s 'land boom' saw the construction of approximately a dozen 'lofty edifices' of 8 to 10 floors, made possible by the introduction of a pressurised hydraulic power network to operate lifts, and taking load bearing brickwork to great heights. The APA Building (Australian Building) at 12 floors plus spire, was by far the tallest, and can claim to be Australia's first 'skyscraper' and amongst the tallest building in the world when completed in 1889. Aside from the APA Building, a total of 11 'skyscrapers' were located in the Melbourne city centre during this period, including the Finks Building and 3 matching ‘Prell's Buildings’. They were all built in an elaborate High Victorian style, with facades of stucco Renaissance Revival elements, except the APA building which was in red brick Queen Anne, prompting architectural historian Miles Lewis to comment that Melbourne had become a "Queen Anne Chicago". All except two were torn down in the post war boom of the 1960s and 1970s, with the APA controversially demolished in 1981. 
20th century

Following much discussion, a  height limit was introduced to Melbourne in 1916, along with regulations concerning fire-proof construction. This height is often said to have been the limit of fire ladders at the time, but this was an idea that the then fire chief allowed to be widely circulated even though the tallest ladder rose to only , in order to ensure that fire safety was paramount. The main reasons for the limit, as well as fire proofing, were the preservation of light and air to the streets, avoiding congestion, and the influence of the City Beautiful movement, preferring evenly scaled streetscapes over those with buildings of varying heights. The height limit remained in force for nearly 40 years, allowing only uninhabited 'architectural features' to project beyond the 40 metre limit.

Melbourne was the first city in Australia to undergo a post-war high-rise boom beginning in the late 1950s, (though Sydney in the following decades built more) with over 50 high-rise buildings constructed between the 1970s and 1990s. Its variation was on the basis that the design included an open garden space at ground level, introducing the concept of floor area ratio, where a total allowable floor area is used instead of a specific height limit. This was formalised by 'plot ratios' of 1:8 to 1:12 for different areas of the CBD in the "Borrie Report" in 1964, which was modified into a series of 'plot ratio benefit' scheme in the early 1980s, where the upper level of floor area could only be achieved in return for certain public benefits, such as a public arcade. Plot ratios remained in force for every site until 1999, when the 'New Format' Planning Scheme included plot ratios for entire city blocks rather than individual sites, a control that was mostly ignored.

The William Street building was the city's tallest for a few years, and remains one of the few heritage registered skyscrapers in Melbourne.

By the early 1980s, Melbourne had a total of 6 buildings above , with the completion of the Wentworth (later Regent then Sofitel) Hotel at Collins Place in 1980. At the time of its opening, it was the 25th–tallest building in the world. Specifically, 1991 saw the construction of the  101 Collins Street, which was crowned the tallest building in Australia and the Southern Hemisphere; it was surpassed in height later that year with the completion of the nearby 120 Collins Street.

21st century
During the 2000s, over 20 high-rise structures were completed, including the Eureka Tower (2006), which overtook 120 Collins Street as the tallest building in Melbourne, and further became the second-tallest in Australia (although tallest to its roof). Eureka Tower was also the tallest residential building in the world to roof, until surpassed by Ocean Heights and the HHHR Tower in Dubai. It is currently the 15th-tallest apartment building in the world.

Construction trends significantly increased throughout the 2010s, which included the completion of Prima Pearl (2014) and Aurora Melbourne Central (2019), both of which exceed  in height. Throughout the decade, the city experienced an "unprecedented" skyscraper construction boom, with 22 skyscrapers constructed between 2010 and 2019. This feat had been described as the "Manhattanization of Melbourne".

During this period, new towers in the CBD had average plot ratios of 37:1. Should projects exceed the plot ratio, developers will need to make a special case to the Minister, outlining the proposal's state significance. These controls were made permanent in September 2016. Buildings proposed prior to September 2015, such as Australia 108, which has a plot ratio of 46.6:1, were exempt from the new law.

The beginning of the 2020s saw the completion of Australia 108, which surpassed Eureka Tower as the tallest building in Melbourne and the tallest building in Australia to roof in 2020. In 2021, 12 skyscrapers were completed in the city— five more than the previous peak in 2020, and more than double prior peaks in 2017, 2005, and 1991. Among the tallest built in 2021 were West Side Place Tower A and Queens Place North Tower, both of which exceed  in height. Of future skyscrapers, 6 have topped-out, 7 are under-construction, over 20 have received approval, and another few have been proposed. The tallest of these is the currently approved dual-skyscraper project STH BNK by Beulah.

The proliferation of skyscrapers in Australia over the past decades has also contributed to the city rivalry between Sydney and Melbourne. Whilst the first skyscraper in Australia was constructed in Sydney in 1967 (Australia Square), Melbourne has had the most skyscrapers in the country and indeed within Oceania, for over 35 years in total; from 1972 to 1989 (equal first with Sydney during 1972–74 and 1976–77), from 1991 to 1999, in 2006 (shared with Sydney), and again since 2015 (equal to Sydney from 2015 to 2016).

Precincts

The central business district skyline is broken down into two distinct sections: the east and west, divided by Swanston Street. The tallest buildings on the eastern side of the skyline are 120 Collins Street and 101 Collins Street, whilst the tallest on the western side are the Rialto Towers, 568 Collins Street, and Bourke Place.

Significant new skylines have emerged outside of the Melbourne central business district, especially within the inner-city suburb of Southbank. This precinct, located adjacent to the City Centre, includes some of the tallest buildings in Melbourne, such as Australia 108, Eureka Tower, and Prima Pearl.

South Yarra, St Kilda Road (a locality adjacent to the City Centre), the inner-city suburbs Carlton, and Docklands each comprise a skyscraper. Other inner-city suburbs, such as Port Melbourne and South Melbourne each have skyscrapers in proposed or approved stages of development.

Functions
Most of Melbourne's skyscrapers constructed by the 1990s were built for commercial purposes—specifically, used as offices. Exceptions to this, include the mixed-use building Sofitel Hotel (1980) on Collins Place, and the all-hotel Crown Towers (1997) in Southbank. 2005 ushered in the first residential skyscrapers in Melbourne, with two built that year. By 2010, 72% of skyscrapers built in Melbourne were of commercial use, 12% residential, 12% mixed-use, and 4% hotel. The trend towards residential skyscrapers has continued significantly; in 2015, 58% of skyscrapers present within the city were of commercial use, 26% residential, 13% mixed-use and 3% hotel. These figures are set to change dramatically by 2020; when factoring those buildings still under-construction (but to be completed by 2020), 44% of the city's skyscrapers will be of residential use, 35% commercial, 18% mixed-use, 2% hotel, and 2% government.

Completed

Overall
Such measurement includes spires and architectural details, but does not include antenna masts. An equal sign (=) following a rank indicates the same height between two or more buildings. An asterisk (*) indicates that the building is still under construction, but has topped out. The "built" column indicates the year in which a building was completed.
Height: S = Spire, R = Roof.

Tallest buildings by precinct
This lists the tallest building in each precinct of Melbourne based on standard height measurement.

Tallest buildings by function
This lists the tallest buildings in Melbourne by their respective functions—office, hotel, residential and mixed-use—based on standard height measurement.

Skyscrapers at least 200 metres in height
Melbourne comprises 27 skyscrapers (completed or topped-out) which reach a height of at least —more than any other city within Australia and Oceania. Of those, twenty-one skyscrapers are located within the City Centre, five are located within Southbank, and one in Carlton. Another three skyscrapers are currently under construction in the City Centre and one in Southbank.

Timeline of tallest buildings
This lists buildings that once held the title of "tallest building in Melbourne".

Future skyscrapers
This is a list of currently topped out, under construction, approved and proposed skyscrapers set for Melbourne.

Major cancelled, revised, or vision projects
This is a list of cancelled, revised or vision skyscraper proposals that were previously set for Melbourne.

See also

Architecture of Melbourne
List of tallest buildings in Australia
List of tallest buildings in Oceania

Notes

References

External links

 Walking Melbourne Tallest building chronology
 Emporis.com Melbourne High-rise Buildings

 
Melbourne
Tallest buildings, Melbourne